WDBA-LP (105.5 FM) is a low-power FM radio station broadcasting a Spanish Christian format. Licensed to Farmingdale, New York, the station is currently owned by Fuente de Luz Radio, Inc.

History
This station received its original construction permit from the Federal Communications Commission on October 21, 2014, with a scheduled expiration of April 21, 2016. The new station was assigned the WDBA-LP call sign by the FCC on October 28, 2014. and received its license to cover from the FCC on February 3, 2016.

Initially, the station broadcast a country format as "The Hawk," but wasn't able to get enough underwriters to sustain it. In late 2016, they switched over to Spanish Christian, and made the country format online only.

References

External links

DBA-LP
DBA-LP
Radio stations established in 2016
2016 establishments in New York (state)
Mass media in Nassau County, New York
Oyster Bay (town), New York
DBA-LP